Cadw is the historic environment service of the Welsh Government which manages historical buildings and ancient monuments in Wales.

Location map

See also
List of National Trust properties in Wales
Scheduled Monuments in Wales

References

Cadw (Welsh Heritage) Properties